Prosperin may refer to:
 7292 Prosperin, an asteroid named after astronomer Erik Prosperin
 Erik Prosperin (1739–1803), a Swedish astronomer